Colleen Atwood (born September 25, 1948) is an American costume designer.

Atwood has been nominated for the Academy Award for Best Costume Design twelve times, winning four times - for the films Chicago (2002), Memoirs of a Geisha (2005), Alice in Wonderland (2010), and Fantastic Beasts and Where to Find Them (2016); the latter is the first Wizarding World film to win an Academy Award. She has collaborated several times with directors Tim Burton, Rob Marshall and Jonathan Demme.

Early life and education
Born in Yakima, Washington, she studied painting at Cornish College of the Arts in Seattle, Washington in the early 1970s, and later worked in retail at various places, including the Yves St. Laurent boutique at Frederick & Nelson department store in the city.

Career
Atwood began her career as a fashion advisor in Washington in the early 1970s.  She moved to New York in 1980, where she studied art at New York University. Her movie career started after a chance encounter with someone whose mother was designing the sets for the film Ragtime, and she got the job of a PA (production assistant) in the film. She worked as an assistant to a costume designer and eventually earned her first film credit for A Little Sex, directed by Bruce Paltrow.

Eventually Atwood ventured into the world of costume design for theater and film, initially coming to fame through her work on Sting's Bring On the Night World Tour, also made into a documentary by the same name. An important turning point in her career came when, through production designer Bo Welch with whom she had worked in Joe Versus the Volcano, she met director Tim Burton.  Atwood and Burton worked together on over seven films in the next two decades, starting with Edward Scissorhands and including Sleepy Hollow, Ed Wood, Big Fish, Planet of the Apes, and Sweeney Todd. She moved to Los Angeles in 1990.

Atwood has been partially involved in developing or has been the lead designer for producing the costumes on over 50 films to date. She was the lead costume designer for all the new costumes created for Ringling Bros. and Barnum & Bailey Circus in 2005–2006. She also designed The Black Parade band uniforms for the band My Chemical Romance, as well as costumes for the following album, Danger Days: The True Lives of the Fabulous Killjoys. She also designs for television, including Arrow, The Flash, and Supergirl.

Atwood's favorite fashion designers include Azzedine Alaia, Yohji Yamamoto and Alexander McQueen.

Filmography

Television 
 The Tick (2001)
 Arrow (2012)
 The Flash (2014)
 Supergirl (2015)
 The Tick (2017)
 Wednesday (2022)
 Masters of the Air (TBA)

Awards and nominations
Academy Awards
 Nominated: Best Costume Design, Little Women (1994)
 Nominated: Best Costume Design, Beloved (1998)
 Nominated: Best Costume Design, Sleepy Hollow (1999)
 Won: Best Costume Design, Chicago (2002)
 Nominated: Best Costume Design, Lemony Snicket's A Series of Unfortunate Events (2004)
 Won: Best Costume Design, Memoirs of a Geisha (2005)
 Nominated: Best Costume Design, Sweeney Todd: The Demon Barber of Fleet Street (2007)
 Nominated: Best Costume Design, Nine (2009)
 Won: Best Costume Design, Alice in Wonderland (2010)
 Nominated: Best Costume Design, Snow White and the Huntsman (2012)
 Nominated: Best Costume Design, Into the Woods (2014)
 Won: Best Costume Design, Fantastic Beasts and Where to Find Them (2016)

BAFTA Awards
 Nominated: Best Costume Design, Edward Scissorhands (1990)
 Nominated: Best Costume Design, Little Women (1994)
 Won: Best Costume Design, Sleepy Hollow (1999)
 Nominated: Best Costume Design, Planet of the Apes (2001)
 Nominated: Best Costume Design, Chicago (2002)
 Won: Best Costume Design, Memoirs of a Geisha (2005)
 Nominated: Best Costume Design, Sweeney Todd: The Demon Barber of Fleet Street (2007)
 Won: Best Costume Design, Alice in Wonderland (2010)
 Nominated: Best Costume Design, Snow White and the Huntsman (2012)
 Nominated: Best Costume Design, Into the Woods (2014)
 Nominated: Best Costume Design, Fantastic Beasts and Where to Find Them (2016)

Primetime Emmy Awards
 'Won: Outstanding Costumes for a Variety/Music Program or a Special, Tony Bennett: An American Classic (2006)

References

 Colleen Atwood Biography (1950-) filmreference''

External links 

 
 Palm Springs Life, January 2004
 Council of Fashion Designers of America

1948 births
American costume designers
Best Costume Design Academy Award winners
Best Costume Design BAFTA Award winners
Cornish College of the Arts alumni
Living people
People from Yakima, Washington
Women costume designers